Calochortus greenei is a species of flowering plant in the lily family known by the common name Greene's mariposa lily. It is native to northern California and southern Oregon, where it grows in the forest and woodlands of the mountains. It is a perennial herb which produces a branching stem up to about 30 centimeters in maximum height. There is a basal leaf about 20 centimeters long which does not wither at flowering. The inflorescence bears 1 to 5 erect bell-shaped flowers . Each flower has three sepals and three light purple petals with darker areas at the bases. The petals are 3 to 4 centimeters long and have a coat of long hairs on their inner surfaces. The fruit is a winged capsule about 2 centimeters long.

References

External links
Jepson Manual Treatment
USDA Plants Profile
Flora of North America
Photo gallery

greenei
Flora of California
Flora of Oregon
Flora of the Cascade Range
Flora of the Klamath Mountains
Taxa named by Sereno Watson